The British Museum Act 1767 (7 Geo 3 c 18) was an Act of the Parliament of Great Britain.

The whole Act was repealed by section 13(5) of, and Schedule 4 to, the British Museum Act 1963.

See also
British Museum Act

References
Halsbury's Statutes,

Great Britain Acts of Parliament 1767
British Museum Acts
1760s in London